Mark VI or Mark 6 may refer to:

In technology

In military and weaponry
 Mark VI (tank), a British tank design from World War I
 Vickers Mk.VI light tank, a British tank design from the first years of World War II
 16"/45 caliber Mark 6 gun, World War II-era U.S. Navy gun used as main armament on six fast battleships
 Supermarine Spitfire Mk VI, high altitude Royal Air Force fighter with five-blade propeller
 Mark 6 nuclear bomb (1951–1955), an American nuclear bomb
 Mk 6 helmet (1987), British Army standard kevlar helmet
 Mark VI, a fixed blade model from Chris Reeve Knives
 Webley Mark VI, a British Service revolver
 Mark VI patrol boat, an American patrol craft

Other vehicles
 Bentley Mark VI (1946–1952), a British luxury car made by Bentley
 Continental Mark VI (1980–1983), American luxury car made by Ford Motor Company
 Mark VI monorail, used since 1989 at Walt Disney World in Orlando, Florida and later in Las Vegas, Nevada

People
 Patriarch Mark VI of Alexandria, served from 1459 to 1484
 Pope Mark VI of Alexandria (died 1656), Coptic Pope from 1645 to 1660

Other uses
 Mark 6 or Mark VI, the sixth chapter of the Gospel of Mark in the New Testament of the Christian Bible
 Mark Six, a lottery game
 Vox Mark VI, a 1962 teardrop shaped electric guitar
 Selmer Mark VI, high quality saxophone line made by Selmer beginning in the mid-1950s
 Mark VI class of industrial control systems used by General Electric
 Halo 3, mechanical armor variant is known as Mark VI